PMLE may refer to:

Polymorphous light eruption
Progressive multifocal leukoencephalopathy